Trail Dust is a 1924 American silent Western film directed by Gordon Hines and starring David Dunbar, Louise McComb and William Lenders. Portraying settlers in nineteenth century Oklahoma Territory, it was shot on location at the 101 Ranch in the state.

Cast
 David Dunbar as Joe Paden 
 Louise McComb as Meg Jordan 
 William Lenders as Reverend Judson Lee 
 Beth Ivins as Betty Lee 
 Ralph W. Chambers as Church Logan 
 Alfred Hewston as Horsefly Higgins 
 Ray Howard as Chris Fast Bear 
 Etha Ramsdell as Maggie Moon-Cow

References

Bibliography
 John Wooley. Shot in Oklahoma: A Century of Sooner State Cinema. University of Oklahoma Press, 2012.

External links
 

1924 films
1924 Western (genre) films
American black-and-white films
Rayart Pictures films
Films set in Oklahoma
Silent American Western (genre) films
1920s English-language films
1920s American films